Stadio Alberto Picco is the main football stadium in La Spezia, Italy. Since 1919 it is the home ground of Spezia Calcio. The stadium holds 11,466.

Gallery

 Image from Google Maps

References

External links
 Picco at Stadium Journey

Venue
Alberto Picco
Sports venues in Liguria